Charles Albert Ashburner (February 9, 1854 – December 24, 1889) was an American geologist. 
 
Charles Albert Ashburner was born on February 9, 1854, in Philadelphia.  He graduated from the University of Pennsylvania in 1874. During the summer of 1872 he was engaged on the survey of the Delaware River, and on his graduation he accepted a place in the light-house survey service. In 1874 the geological survey of Pennsylvania was reorganized with the appointment of Prof. J. P. Lesley as state geologist, and Ashburner resigned from the U. S. service to become an assistant on the survey. He was actively employed during the latter part of 1874 in the surveys of Mifflin and Juniata counties, and in 1875 was appointed assistant geologist, with charge of the surveys in McKean, Elk, Forest, and Cameron counties In 1880 he was appointed geologist in charge of the survey of the anthracite coal fields, where he originated a method for surveying and representing the geology of this great coal-bed which has received the approbation of mining engineers and geologists both in the United States and in Europe. The ability and skill with which this undertaking was performed led to his being appointed in 1885 geologist in charge of all the office and field work of the survey. Ashburner was a member of the American Philosophical Society, the American Institute of Mining Engineers, and other scientific societies, to whose proceedings he contributed valuable papers. He also contributed to the scientific and technical journals, and prepared more than twenty of the reports of the geological survey. In 1889 he was made Sc. D. Charles Albert Ashburner died on December 24, 1889, in Pittsburgh.

Created via preloaddraft
1854 births
1889 deaths
Scientists from Philadelphia
Members of the American Philosophical Society
University of Pennsylvania alumni
19th-century American geologists